Silviu Lung (born 4 June 1989) is a Romanian professional footballer who plays as a goalkeeper for Saudi Professional League club Al-Raed.

International career
He played his first match for Romania in 2010, being used by coach Răzvan Lucescu to replace Bogdan Lobonț in the last 7 minutes of a friendly match against Honduras which ended with a 3–0 victory. His second game was a 1–1 against Albania at the Euro 2012 qualifiers and his last game was 2–1 loss against Algeria in a friendly. He was an unused member at Euro 2016. In 2020 he announced his international retirement, after having no caps in the last 6 years.

Personal life
Lung's father and older brother Tiberiu were also professional footballers.

Career statistics

International

Honours
FC Universitatea Craiova
Divizia B: 2005–06

Astra Giurgiu
Liga I: 2015–16
Cupa României: 2013–14; runner-up: 2016–17
Supercupa României: 2014, 2016

Kayserispor
Turkish Cup runner-up: 2021–22

References

External links
 
 
 
 
 

1989 births
Living people
Sportspeople from Craiova
Romanian footballers
Association football goalkeepers
Liga I players
Süper Lig players
Saudi Professional League players
FC U Craiova 1948 players
FC Astra Giurgiu players
Kayserispor footballers
Al-Raed FC players
Romania under-21 international footballers
Romania international footballers
UEFA Euro 2016 players
Romanian expatriate footballers
Expatriate footballers in Turkey
Romanian expatriate sportspeople in Turkey
Expatriate footballers in Saudi Arabia
Romanian expatriate sportspeople in Saudi Arabia